The 2023 LFA season is the eight season of operation (seventh season of play) of the Liga de Fútbol Americano Profesional (LFA), the top American football league in Mexico. The regular season began on 4 March and will end on 14 May, with the playoffs beginning on 20 May and ending with the Tazón México VI, on 10 May.

Preseason events

Expansion
Three new teams joined the league for the 2023 season: Caudillos de Chihuahua (based in Chihuahua City), Jefes de Ciudad Juárez (based in Ciudad Juárez) and Reds de la Ciudad de México (based in Mexico City). The three teams were part of Fútbol Americano de México, but after the league folded in September 2022, they joined the LFA.

Stadium changes
Raptors will play in the Estadio José Ortega Martínez after playing in the FES Acatlán during 2022.
Reds will play in the Estadio ITESM CCM, after initially announcing that they would be playing at the Estadio Jesús Martínez "Palillo", already used by Mexicas.
Reyes will play in the Fortaleza Azul, with capacity for 5,000 seated spectators, after playing in the Estadio Tres de Marzo during 2022.

Coaching changes
Galgos: Héctor del Águila replaced Guillermo Ruiz Burguete as the team's head coach.

Teams

Regular season

Standings
Note: GP = Games played, W = Wins, L = Losses, PF = Points For, PA = Points against

Schedule

Playoffs

Playoff bracket

Results

Awards

Players of the week
The following were named the top performers during the 2023 season:

References

LFA
LFA
LFA seasons